Philip Metcalfe, (29 August 1733 – 26 August 1818), was an English Tory politician, a malt distiller and a philanthropist.

The Metcalfe family were from Yorkshire of the Catholic faith and Royalists during the Civil war.

Family and early life
He was born in London on 29 August 1733 and christened in Much Hadham in Hertfordshire on 14 December 1733, second son of Roger Metcalfe  (1680 – 5 January 1744–5), a surgeon of Brownlow Street now Betterton Street, Drury Lane, London and Jemima Astley (born on 3 August 1703).
Metcalfe was named after his grandfather Sir Philip Astley (1667–1739), 2nd Baronet of Hill Morton. Jemima Metcalfe married afterwards to Henry Groome, a limen-draper of St Paul's, Covent Garden and who was also the Keeper of the Guildhall and a member of the Worshipful Company of Musicians.

Mectalfe is said to have been the apprentice of Robert Jones (died in 1774), a wine merchant and East India Company director who became a member of Parliament for Huntingdon from 1754 to 1774. According to English painter and diarist Joseph Farington, Jones wanted Meltcalfe to marry Ann Jones (1747–1832), his only daughter and sole heir, she was still a minor when she chose instead to marry with a Marriage license a British officer, James Whorwood Adeane (1740-1802) at Marylebone on 5 March 1763. Through his brother Christopher, Metcalfe became involved with the Three Mills venture in 1759. From partner, Metcalfe will eventually become the head of the Three Mills distillery.

Business and parliamentary career
Metcalfe was the head of the firm Metcalfe and co, a West Ham distillery in Essex, the others partners were Metcalfe's brothers Christopher and Roger, James Mure, James Baker, William Bowman, Samuel Jones Vachell and Joseph Benjamin Claypole. Metcalfe was a member of Parliament for Horsham from 1784. He represented 
Plympton Erle, Devon from 1790 to 1796 and Malmesbury Wiltshire from 1796. Of his parliamentary career, Metcalfe left few records, each times voting on Pitt side including Richmond's fortifications plan along the southern coast of England (27 Feb 1786) and stood with him on the most debated Regency Bill of 1789.

Arts
With the financial success brought by the gin trade, Metcalfe became a passionate art collector and was a patron of the arts. Among his friends and acquaintances were the writers Samuel Johnson, Frances Burney, the painter Sir Joshua Reynolds, the philosopher Jeremy Bentham and West India merchant and art collector Robert Fullarton Udny (1722–1802) of Teddington, Middlesex. He sat for two portraits that are in the collection of the National Portrait Gallery: one by Pompeo Batoni and one by draughtsman and engraver artist William Evans (after Edward Scott's stipple engraving).

He was appointed an executor to Joshua Reynolds's will, along with Edmund Burke and Edmond Malone.

In 1760 Metcalfe joined the Royal Society of Arts. In 1785, he was made a fellow of the Society of Antiquaries of London, in 1786 and in 1790, under Reynolds's patronage, Metcalfe was elected a member of the Society of Dilettanti and of the Royal Society.

Metcalfe was also a member of the Club. and one of the co-signatories of the Round Robin sent to Dr. Johnson to implore him to revise his Epitaph on poet Oliver Goldsmith.

Legacy

Between 1815 and 1817 he erected a new mill, the Clock Mill, at the Three Mills, decorated with an inscription bearing his initials PM.

Metcalfe was noted for his benefactions to charity, he had erected at Hawstead in 1811 the Alms House for the benefit of the Aged and Deserving Poor.

Miscellany
Metcalfe was mentioned with his associate and kinsman James Baker and Jesse Ramsden in the correspondence between Abraham Pilling and Evan Nepean.

Later life
Metcalfe died a bachelor in Brighton, Sussex on 26 August 1818, aged 85. and was buried a week later on 3 September 1818 in the north aisle of the parish church of St Nicholas.

At the time of his death, his estate was valued at £400,000. Metcalfe heir was his great-nephew Henry Metcalfe (1790–1849), son of Christopher Barton Metcalfe and Sophia Andrews.

Heraldry
The Arms are Argent, three calves passant sa.

Notes

References

Sources
The Early Journals and Letters of Fanny Burney, Volume V, 1782–3.
Life of Samuel Johnson, Volume 4 by James Boswell.
Eight Friends of the Great, by William Prideaux Courtney, published by London Constable and Company, 1910.
The Three Mills, Brombley by Bow, Tide Mills, part three, by E.M Gardner with a foreword from Sir Godfrey Nicholson, MP, 13 March 1957.
The Three Mills distillery in the Georgian era, by Keith Fairclough, published by River Lea Tidal Mill Trust Ltd
Philip Metcalfe (1733–1818), the MP and industrialist who built the Clock Mill, by Keith Fairclough.

External links 
 History of Parliament: Philip Metcalfe 
 Papers concerning the Sir Joshua Reynolds estate: 
 Will of Philip Metcalfe of Hill Street Berkeley Square, Middlesex: 

 

1733 births
1818 deaths
Members of the Parliament of Great Britain for Plympton Erle
Members of the Parliament of the United Kingdom for Malmesbury
UK MPs 1801–1802
British MPs 1784–1790
British MPs 1790–1796
British MPs 1796–1800
Fellows of the Royal Society
People from Hawstead
Members of the Parliament of the United Kingdom for Plympton Erle